There are a number of inter-related fraternal orders named Order of the Foresters. It may refer to:

Independent Order of Foresters
Catholic Orders of Foresters
Ancient Order of Foresters
Foresters Friendly Society
Irish National Foresters